Vanchitra is a small sub-village of Kozhencherry in Pathanamthitta district, Kerala, India.

Location
Vanchitra is on the banks of Pampa River. This place is known for its fertile soil and  beautiful, lush green landscape. Asia's biggest Christian convention held February of every year close to it.

Demographics
Majority of the population are Marthomite/Orthodox/Pentecostal Christians and Hindus.

References 

Villages in Pathanamthitta district